Lauren Grace Perkins (born January 1, 1995) is a professional skateboarder and model from Los Angeles, California.

Skateboarding
Perkins is one of a very small group of professional female skaters.  She began skateboarding in 2005 when a skate park was built close to her house.  She thought it looked fun, so she asked for a skateboard for her birthday.

Away from skateboarding, Perkins enjoys snowboarding, surfing, and motocross.

Skateboard videos and films

Perkins is featured on the skate DVD Getting Nowhere Faster.

Perkins was a stunt double for Jennifer Morrison in the film Grind, performing the characters skateboarding scenes.  This was arranged by her team manager at Volcom.

Perkins was featured in the film MVP 2: Most Vertical Primate playing the character of Sammy Rogers, a young skater competing in a skateboard competition.

Career skateboarding highlights
2005 – First girl to compete street in CASL
2006 – 2nd place in All Girls Street Jam
2006 – 2nd place overall 11-12 age group against all boys
2007 – 1st place at the Gravity Games amateur contest (beating out 45 boys)
2008 – 3rd place Triple Crown
2009 – 1st place All Girls Street Jam
2009 – 2nd place Australia
2010 – 1st place West 49th
2010 – 2nd place overall ladies street  rankings
2011 – 2nd place Gravity Games
2012 - 3rd place XGames Womens Street
2012 – 2nd place Australia
2013 – 2nd place XGames Womens Street
2014 – 2nd place Mystic Cup
2015 – 1st place S3 Super Girl Jam

Television and movies
 Fruit by the Foot Commercial
 “MVP II”
 “Grind”
 Daily Habit (first girl street skateboarder to be on the show)
 CNBC “On the Money”

References

External links

 
 https://web.archive.org/web/20090404065804/http://laurengraceperkins.com/
 Girls Skate Network Interview
 https://archive.today/20130122083811/http://etniesgirl.com/site-images/riders/hero/lauren-perkins-.jpg
 https://web.archive.org/web/20071020110833/http://etniesgirl.com/site-images/riders/hero/lauren-perkins.jpg
 http://www.rip.tv/direct/uploads/images/YZFBgIvS4tQLIZa.jpeg

American skateboarders
Living people
Female skateboarders
X Games athletes
1995 births
American sportswomen
21st-century American women

id:Deddy Dores